SMS Spalato was a torpedo cruiser of the Austro-Hungarian Navy, the second member of the . She was laid down in September 1878, launched in August 1879, and commissioned in September 1881. Too slow to be used in her intended roles as a fleet scout and a flotilla leader, she was immediately taken ashore for several modifications to her propulsion system in an unsuccessful attempt to rectify the problem. As a result, she saw little active service, being used primarily for training purposes. She served in the artillery training school for most of the period between 1897 and 1914. During World War I, she served as a guard ship in Pola, and after the war was ceded to Italy as a war prize. She was broken up for scrap sometime thereafter.

Design

She displaced . The ship's propulsion system consisted of a pair of two-cylinder vertical compound steam engines, with steam provided by five cylindrical fire-tube boilers. Her crew numbered 13 officers and 135 enlisted men.

The ship's gun armament consisted of four  24-caliber (cal.) Breech-loading guns in single mounts, along with one  15-cal. breech-loading gun and two  Nordenfelt guns. She was also armed with four torpedo tubes. The torpedo tubes were located singly, two in the bow and at either beam. Spalato was protected with a thin  armored deck.

Service history
Spalato was laid down in September 1878 by Stabilimento Tecnico Triestino at their San Rocco shipyard and launched on 30 August 1879. Spalato was commissioned into the fleet in September 1881. She was also too slow for use as a reconnaissance vessel or a leader of a torpedo boat flotilla. As a result, she saw little active service. Immediately after commissioning, Spalato was laid up ashore for major modifications. The bow torpedo tube was installed and her propulsion system was completely rebuilt. On 23 November 1884, she was re-launched and began sea trials, which had to be stopped on 24 October 1885 after the starboard engine was damaged in an accident. Her average sustained speed was only .

In 1886, a  Hotchkiss gun was installed on her bow. Beginning on 25 May, Spalato replaced Zara in the torpedo training school while her sister was being modified for training duties. Spalato received four 47 mm 33-cal. quick-firing guns during this period. From 1888 to 1895, Spalato was decommissioned and placed in reserve. She was reactivated for four and a half months in 1896 for training exercises, and again for seven months in 1897 for training. On 1 August 1897, she was assigned to the artillery school with the old screw-frigate Radetzky. For this role, she received several  and  guns, all mounted on her stern. She began service with the artillery school on 14 January 1898 and was moored along the mole at Vergarolla outside Pola. In 1900, she was again reduced to the reserve; the following year, she was re-boilered and rearmed. She returned to the artillery school in 1902, and remained there into 1914.

On 14 March 1914, Spalato was decommissioned, as she was by this time in very poor condition. After the outbreak of World War I, she was stationed as a guard ship outside Pola from 15 April 1914 to 24 May 1915. At some point in 1915, most of her guns were removed, apart from two of the 12 cm guns and the four 47 mm QF guns. With Austria-Hungary's defeat, the Allies seized most of the Austro-Hungarian fleet as war prizes, and Spalato was allocated to Italy, which scrapped her thereafter.

Notes

References

Further reading
 

Zara-class torpedo cruisers
1879 ships